Frontier Law is a 1943 American Western film written and directed by Elmer Clifton. The film stars Russell Hayden, Fuzzy Knight, Dennis Moore, Jennifer Holt, Jack Ingram, Wally Wales, George Eldredge, I. Stanford Jolley and Frank LaRue. The film was released on November 5, 1943, by Universal Pictures.

Plot

Cast         
Russell Hayden as Jim Warren
Fuzzy Knight as Ramblin' Rufe Randel
Dennis Moore as Dusty Norton
Jennifer Holt as Lois Rodgers
Jack Ingram as Joe Hawkins
Wally Wales as Frank Rodgers
George Eldredge as Slinger Jones
I. Stanford Jolley as Weasel
Frank LaRue as Sam Vernon
James Farley as Jed Bates 
Johnny Bond as Jack

References

External links
 

1943 films
1940s English-language films
American Western (genre) films
1943 Western (genre) films
Universal Pictures films
Films directed by Elmer Clifton
American black-and-white films
1940s American films